Lucifer is the second studio album by South Korean boy band Shinee, released on July 19, 2010, in South Korea. It was re-released as Hello on October 4, 2010.
The album is listed by Gaon Album Chart as the sixth best-selling album of 2010 in South Korea, with over 120,000 copies sold.

Background and composition
Lucifer was Shinee's second studio album, coming two years into their career. It marked the first time they were given significant input in the creative direction of an album, from the music to the styling. Member Jonghyun commented, "The public's perception of idols is that we are 'made-up.' In this regard, our company gave us a lot of room [to give more input] during the making of this second album." The group, previously known for their youthful sound, adopted a more adult, "masculine" image as a result.

The album has been described as possessing an "electronica-inspired K-pop sound with a tinge of vintage '80s synth". Lead single "Lucifer" is a 1980s-inspired electronica song that compares a two-faced lover to the devil. "Electric Heart" features "soft, whispering vocals" laid over electronic beats and a guitar chorus. Key named the song his favourite on the album, citing its difference from the band's existing work. Member Onew made his debut as a lyricist on track 9, "Your Name", while Jonghyun contributed lyrics for the second time (after writing lyrics for "Juliette"). "Shout Out" was co-written by all of the members. "Love Still Goes On" is viewed as "kind of a sequel" to "Love Should Go On" from the group's debut mini-album Replay. Minho wrote the raps to "Up & Down", "Obsession", "Your Name", and co-wrote the songs "Wowowow" with JQ and "Shout Out" with the fellow members and Misfit. In the repackaged album Hello, he wrote the rap for the title track "Hello", and co-wrote the raps for "One" and "Get It".

"Ready or Not" was written and composed by Will Simms, a French music producer who made his debut in SM Entertainment with this song. Risto Asikainen and Setä Tamu also contributed to the song and Misfit penned the lyrics.

Release and reception
Teaser images of the band's members were released online from July 8 to July 12. A highlight medley containing snippets of the album tracks was also posted on Shinee's official website on July 15, showcasing the variety of genres. The album was released on July 19, and within hours, topped various physical and digital sales charts in South Korea. The songs on the album "were more carefully selected than ever", and the album itself is said to "[give] listeners a great chance to experience the diverse musical characters and more mature vocal skills of the members". 

"Lucifer" was choreographed by Rino Nakasone, who choreographed Shinee's early songs like "Replay" in 2008. For its choreography, "Lucifer" was nominated for the Best Dance Performance Award at the Mnet Asian Music Awards in 2010. Lucifer also became the sixth best-selling album of 2010 in South Korea, selling over 120,000 copies. In the US, the single "Lucifer" charted on Billboards World Digital Song Sales chart for 57 weeks.

Shinee released a repackaged album of Lucifer called Hello on October 4, 2010. The lead single, also titled "Hello", was released a few days earlier on September 30. The repackaged album Hello sold 63,118 copies in 2010 according to the Korean sales chart Gaon.

On November 26, 2010, the track "Obsession" was announced as the theme song for the film, The Warrior's Way. The lead single "Lucifer" was also featured on the January 29, 2018 episode of Fox's popular TV series, Lucifer.

Track listing

Charts

Weekly charts

Monthly charts

Year-end charts

Certifications and sales

Accolades

Release history

Lucifer

Hello

References

External links

SM Entertainment albums
2010 albums
Shinee albums
Korean-language albums